Euphaeidae, sometimes incorrectly named Epallagidae and commonly called gossamerwings, is a family of damselflies in the odonate superfamily Calopterygoidea. The family is small, consisting of around 78 species living species in nine genera occurring in the Palearctic, Australasia, and Asia.  The family contains two subfamilies, Euphaeinae, encompassing all the living species and a single fossil genus, and the extinct Eodichromatinae, encompassing fossil genera from the Eocene to late Oligocene. Euphaeid species are large and mostly metallic-coloured, looking similar to species of damselflies in the family Calopterygidae.

The larvae have seven pairs of supplementary gills along the abdomen in addition to the usual three sac-like gills at the tip of the abdomen. Adults have the fore- and hindwings of equal length, barely petiolate and a long pterostigma that is broader in the hindwing. Adults have close veins and numerous antenodals (15-38), and most breed in forest streams.

Subfamilies, tribes, and genera
†Eodichromatinae
†Eodichromatini
†Ejerslevia  (Fur Formation, Ypresian, Denmark)
†Eodichroma  (Wellborn Formation, Priabonian, Texas)
†Labandeiraia  (Fur Formation & Green River Formation, Ypresian, Denmark & Colorado)
†Parazacallites  (Aix-en-Provence Formation, Chattian, France)
†Republica  (Klondike Mountain Formation, Ypresian, Washington)
†Solveigia wittecki  (Fur Formation, Ypresian, Denmark)
†Wolfgangeuphaea  (Baltic Amber, Priabonian, Europe)
†Litheuphaeini
†Litheuphaea  (Goshen flora, Green River Formation & Baltic Amber, Ypresian - Repuelian?, Europe, Colorado, & Oregon)
incertae sedis
†Eodysphaea  (Green River Formation, Ypresian, Colorado)
Euphaeinae
Anisopleura 
Bayadera 
Cryptophaea 
Dysphaea 
†Elektroeuphaea  (Baltic Amber, Priabonian, Europe)
Epallage 
Euphaea 
Heterophaea 
Schmidtiphaea 
Incertae sedis
†Epallagites  (Green River Formation, Ypresian, Colorado)

References

 
Odonata families